Zulachay Rural District is in the Central District of Salmas County, West Azerbaijan province, Iran. At the National Census of 2006, its population was 24,868 in 5,417 households. There were 29,037 inhabitants in 7,349 households at the following census of 2011. At the most recent census of 2016, the population of the rural district was 29,524 in 7,881 households. The largest of its 40 villages was Haftevan, with 8,203 people.

References 

Salmas County

Rural Districts of West Azerbaijan Province

Populated places in West Azerbaijan Province

Populated places in Salmas County